Belton-Honea Path High School (BHP) is a comprehensive, co-educational, public secondary school located in Honea Path, South Carolina, United States. It is the only public high school serving Honea Path and Belton. The school is accredited by the South Carolina Department of Education and the Southern Association of Colleges and Schools.

History
Belton-Honea Path High School was built in 1966, and renovations and additions were made in 1967, 1987 and 2003. The school originally opened as a merger of Belton High School and Honea Path High School. It merged with Geer Gant High School in 1969.

Athletics
Belton-Honea Path has teams for tennis, soccer, golf, wrestling, basketball, cross country, track and field, volleyball, baseball, competitive cheerleading, marching band, softball, and football.

Notable alumni

Mark Burns, pastor (did not graduate)
Matthew LeCroy, former MLB player
Dwight A. McBride, academic and president of The New School

References

External links
 

Educational institutions established in 1966
Public high schools in South Carolina
Schools in Anderson County, South Carolina
1966 establishments in South Carolina